The Turner stability class or Turner stability index is a classification of atmospheric stability over an interval of time based on measurements of surface-level wind speed and net solar radiation.  Classes range from 1 (most unstable) to 7 (most stable).  The Turner stability class system was devised by D. B. Turner as a modification of the Pasquill stability class system.

The following table is used to determine the Turner stability class for a given wind speed and net solar radiation:

The net radiation index is determined by following a procedure (see flowchart) that takes into account the cloud cover, ceiling height, and solar altitude.

References 

Atmosphere